Swimming at the 2011 Games of the Small States of Europe was held from 31 May – 3 June 2011.

Medal summary

Men

Women

Medal table
After 32 events.

References
Swimming Site of the 2011 Games of the Small States of Europe

Games of the Small States of Europe
2011 Games of the Small States of Europe
2011